Muhammad Yunus Nawandish (Uzbek/) was the Mayor of Kabul from after his appointment by Afghan President Hamid Karzai in January 2010. During his time in office the Mayor initiated an aggressive program of municipal improvements in streets, parks, greenery, revenue collection, environmental control, and solid waste management.

He was assisted in his municipal reform efforts by the USAID's “Kabul City Initiative” project, the World Bank, Japanese Government JICA and other International Donors to build municipal capacity, improve service delivery and infrastructure, and increase municipal revenue for a cleaner and greener Kabul.

Nawandish also serves as a member of the Kabul Polytechnic University’s Academic Council and of Kabul University. He is a member of two non – governmental organizations: the Afghanistan Engineers and Architects Association and Afghan American Engineers Union. Nawandish is also current president of Society of Afghan Architects and Engineers (SAAE).
 
Nawandish was reluctant to be the mayor of Kabul at first due to its difficulty. His day begins at five in the morning and usually ends at about one the following morning. 

He is a compulsive walker, sometimes covering as much as 10 km (six miles) a day. The mayor is known to be a night bird. He often inspects Kabul's streets at night when residents of the city are fast asleep. Mr Nawandish has succeeded in generating millions of dollars more revenue for Kabul during his tenure - mainly from retail taxes, business taxes, advertisements and property and business taxes. He also has regular visits to Washington, Moscow and Istanbul. One of the mayor's top objectives now is his ongoing campaign to remove illegal shops, buildings and illegally parked carts from the city's streets and pavements.

Early years
Muhammad Yunus Nawandish has thirty years of experience in the oil, gas and power sectors in Afghanistan. He served as Manager of the Afghan Gas Refinery Department, Ministry of Mines and Industry (MMI) from 1979 – 1981; as Adviser in Ministry of foreign affairs from 1984 – 1988; as Petroleum Engineer (MMI) from 1989 – 1992; and as Professor of Engineering at Balkh University in northern Afghanistan from 1992 – 1994. During the Taliban regime (1998 – 2001) the Mayor lived outside Afghanistan.
 
From 2001 to 2005 he served as Deputy Minister of Water and Energy. Since 2005 he managed new construction and rehabilitation projects in the generation, transmission and distribution of energy in a conflict environment.

He designed the largest power sector project in Afghanistan, the Northern Transmission System which provides power to Afghanistan from Uzbekistan. On behalf of the Afghan Government, he has coordinated over $500 million in power sector projects in cooperation with the Asian Development Bank, USAID, the European Union, The World Bank, and the Governments of India, Iran, Turkmenistan, Tajikistan and South Korea. He has worked as a senior advisor on the U.S. Agency for International Development funded project to rehabilitate the Sheberghan gas fields.

Personal life and education
Muhammad Yunus Nawandish holds a B.S in Petroleum Engineering from Polytechnical University of Kabul and a M.S in Gas Production and Distribution Specialty from Ukraine. He is married and has 6 children.

Achievements and awards
The Mayor of Kabul was invited to the United States Conference of Mayors (USCM) as a special guest in 2011. He is the first public participation gold medalist in Afghanistan that was awarded by the Citizens in Kabul. The Christian Science Monitor hailed Mayor Nawandish as "The can-do mayor of Kabul: Some see a model for a modern Afghanistan politician". He has also been dubbed as the "Builder of Kabul".

In 2012 Muhammad Yunus Nawandish was selected for 16 best mayors of the world by Graduate Institute of International and Development Studies in Geneva Switzerland, and he has been chosen for top 5 mayors among all 16 mayors of the other countries.

Mayoral highlights
Gets foreign donors to pay for everything from solar-powered streetlights and public toilets to bus networks and overpasses. They build it, he names it.

Has brought high-level pothole politics to this previously ungovernable, bombed-out city.

With hardly any tax revenues, he has found something useful to say to the city's hundreds of aid agencies: “Build me something that will last 10 years.”

References

External links

 https://blogs.worldbank.org/category/tags/mayor-nawandish
 http://www.ecocity-2013.com/en/mohammad-yunus-nawandish/
 https://www.youtube.com/channel/UCH4Z4aGwlWiLw1sZzN3nIkQ

Mayors of Kabul
People from Kabul
Afghan politicians
Afghan Uzbek politicians
Living people
Year of birth missing (living people)
Mayors of places in Afghanistan
Kabul Polytechnic University alumni